The governor of Cotabato is the executive leader of the province of Cotabato of the Philippines.

Prior to the establishment of Cotabato as a province on September 1, 1914, the area covered by the historical Province of Cotabato was governed by District Governors which were all American members of the Philippine Constabulary. Before 1914 (1899-1913), all of the district governors had the rank of major except for Don Ramon Vilo who governed the area in 1898. Cotabato received its first Civil Governor in 1941.

List

References

Politics of Cotabato
Cotabato